Pinehurst is the name of some places in the U.S. state of Texas:
Pinehurst, Montgomery County, Texas
Pinehurst, Orange County, Texas

es:Pinehurst (Texas)